Chakur Taluka is a taluka, administrative subdivision, of Latur District in Maharashtra, India.  The administrative center for the taluka is the village of Chakur. In the 2011 census there were seventy-two panchayat villages in Chakur Taluka.

Economy
The taluka is primarily rural and most people's occupation is farming.  The crops taken in the taluka include jowar, red gram, soybean, and sugarcane.  Many farmers have started getting income out of fruits like kesar mangoes and grapes.

Notes

External links
 

Chakur